Cornelis Wilhelm "Kees" Jonker (29 March 1909 in Amsterdam – 2 February 1987 in Steinach am Brenner) was a sailor from the Netherlands, who represented his country at the 1936 Summer Olympics in Kiel. Jonker, as crew member on the Dutch 6 Metre De Ruyter, took the 8th place with helmsman Joop Carp and fellow crew members Ansco Dokkum, Ernst Moltzer, and Herman Looman. During the 1948 Summer Olympics in Torbay, Jonker helmed the Dragon Joy, with crew members Biem Dudok van Heel and Wim van Duyl, to an 8th place.

Sources
 
 
 
 
 
 

1909 births
1987 deaths
Sportspeople from Amsterdam
Dutch male sailors (sport)

Sailors at the 1936 Summer Olympics – 6 Metre
Sailors at the 1948 Summer Olympics – Dragon
Olympic sailors of the Netherlands
20th-century Dutch people